The New 1st Army was reputed to be the most elite military unit of the Chinese National Revolutionary Army. Nicknamed the "First Army Under Heaven" during the Chinese Civil War, it caused the most Japanese Army casualties during the Sino-Japanese War (1937-1945).

History 
Formed from the X Force, particularly the New 38th Division, the New 1st Army was among the top five Nationalist crack units. The other four included the New 6th Army, the Reorganized 11th Division (army-sized, formerly known as the 18th Army and later reverted to its original designation), the Reorganized 74th Division (army sized, formerly known as the 74th Army), and the 5th Army.

After the New 38th Division under Sun Li-jen and New 22nd Division under Liao Yao-hsiang retreated to India from Burma in the first phase of the Burma Campaign, the two divisions obtained American equipment and training at Ramgarh, India. There the New 1st Army was formed in February 1943 with the three divisions: the New 38th, the New 22nd and the New 30th. Lieutenant-General Qiu Qingquan was appointed its commander, but was soon replaced by Lieutenant-General Cheng Tung-kuo. Sun Li-jen served as the deputy commander but took over tactical command at the beginning of the second phase of the Burma Campaign. In May 1944, Sun was promoted its commander.

During the Chinese Civil War, the New 1st Army was deployed to Northeast China to fight against Chinese Communist Party military units under Lin Biao. It saw much success in the early battles. However, after some time, Sun was dismissed as commander after offending important members of the KMT, including his superior, Chiang Kai-shek's favorite Lieutenant-General Du Yuming. Sun was replaced by Lieutenant-General Pan Yukun on 26 April 1947. Most officers above battalion level were also dismissed. This dealt a huge blow to the New 1st Army and it began to suffer heavy losses. The Army saw its last action in the effort to relieve the KMT-controlled city of Jinzhou in late October 1948 as part of General Liao Yao-hsiang's 9th Army Corps. The entire army was wiped out. General Pan barely escaped with his life. The commanders of the three divisions (New 30th, 50th and Provisional 53rd) were either captured or surrendered. Due to this army's group uneasy history with both the KMT and Chinese Communist Party, its successes are rarely talked about across both mainland China and Taiwan.

See also

Battle of Yenangyaung
Military history of China
New Fourth Army
Battle of Toungoo

References

External links
 公共電視_孫立人三部曲
 義子揭鈞紀念孫立人之網頁
 台中市政府文化局：人物剪影——孫立人
 《人民日报》历史上的今天，11月19日

Armies of the National Revolutionary Army
Military units and formations established in 1943
Military units and formations in Burma in World War II